Pseudophilautus rus, known as  Kandian shrub frog is a species of frogs in the family Rhacophoridae.

It is endemic to Sri Lanka.

Its natural habitats are subtropical or tropical moist lowland forests, rural gardens, and heavily degraded former forest.
It is becoming rarer due to habitat loss.

References

rus
Endemic fauna of Sri Lanka
Frogs of Sri Lanka
Taxa named by Rohan Pethiyagoda
Amphibians described in 2004
Taxonomy articles created by Polbot